Death penalty may refer to:

Capital punishment, the act of the state putting a person to death

Sports 

Death penalty (NCAA), the nickname for U.S. college athletics policy which forbids a school from fielding a certain team

Entertainment 

Death Penalty (album), a 1982 album by the heavy-metal band Witchfinder General
 "Death Penalty", the title track from the aforementioned Witchfinder General album
Death Penalty (film), a 1980 television film starring Colleen Dewhurst